Prince Wlame (born 7 May 1993) is a Liberian football goalkeeper for LPRC Oilers.

References

1993 births
Living people
Liberian footballers
Liberia international footballers
LISCR FC players
LPRC Oilers players
Association football goalkeepers
Place of birth missing (living people)